Holmsund is a locality situated in Umeå Municipality, Västerbotten County, Sweden with 5,489 inhabitants in 2010. It is located 18 km south of the city of Umeå and serves as a port for Umeå.

Position
Holmsund lies at the mouth of the Ume River. To the west, across the river estuary, is a town called Obbola, the towns are connected by the E12 road which is carried over the river estuary by the Obbola Bridge. Both Holmsund and Obbola have wood and paper industries. From the southern end of Holmsund a ferry service runs to the Finnish port of Vaasa.

History
Swedish water-powered sawmills were under threat when steam power was introduced to Sweden in 1849. The largest Swedish water-powered saw mill was at Baggböle. It was one of the last to close in 1884 when Holmsund built a steam-powered mill. Swedish sawn timber became a major export.

Notable residents

Sports people 

Thommy Abrahamsson ice hockey player, born in Holmsund
Christer Abris ice hockey player, born in Holmsund
Hjalmar Bergström skier, born in Holmsund
Kent Forsberg ice hockey trainer, born in Holmsund.
Gus Forslund ice hockey player, born in Holmsund. 
Elon Sundström ice hockey player, born in Holmsund
Kay Wiestål football player, born in Holmsund

Others 
Fredrik Burgman, journalist
Kjell-Olof Feldt, politician (s), born in Holmsund.
Lisa Miskovsky, musician, born in Holmsund
Frida Selander  musician, raised in Holmsund
Kristofer Steen, guitarist, born in Holmsund
Thure Jadestig politician (s), born in Holmsund
Kurt Ove Johansson politician (s), raised in Holmsund
Eva-Lena Lundgren  Fröken Sverige, born in Holmsund

Holmsund in pictures

Sports
The following sports clubs are located in Holmsund:
 IFK Holmsund
 Sandviks IK

See also
 Blue Highway, an international tourist route

References

External links
Holmsund.org
LänsTrafiken, public  transport

Populated places in Umeå Municipality
Coastal cities and towns in Sweden